Ponnal is a village in Rangareddy district in the Telangana state of India. It falls under Shamirpet mandal. This village is 23 km away from Secunderabad. It is 2 km away from Outer Ring Road. The village is located 6 km away from Shamirpet.

References

Villages in Ranga Reddy district